Boiling Point is a 2021 British drama film directed by Philip Barantini and starring Stephen Graham, Vinette Robinson, Ray Panthaki and Hannah Walters. It is a one-shot film set in a restaurant kitchen. It is an expansion of a 2019 short film of the same name, also directed by Barantini and starring Graham. It was originally planned to record eight takes of the film, but it was only possible to film half of these before a COVID lockdown led to the end of the shoot.

The film premiered at the 55th Karlovy Vary International Film Festival on 23 August 2021. It was released in the United Kingdom on 7 January 2022. The film was met with critical acclaim. At the 75th British Academy Film Awards, the film received four nominations: Outstanding British Film, Outstanding Debut by a British Writer, Director or Producer (writer James Cummings and producer Hester Ruoff), Best Actor in a Leading Role (Graham) and Best Casting (Carolyn Mcleod).

A sequel series for the BBC has been confirmed, with Graham, Robinson and Walters reprising their roles. Philip Barantini will direct the first two episodes and James Cummings will return as writer.

Plot
Andy Jones is Head Chef of Jones & Sons, an upmarket restaurant in London.
Andy is embarrassed to learn that his restaurant has been downgraded from a 5 star Health and Safety rating to 3 stars following an inspection, mostly due to insufficient administration and subpar sanitation at each work station.
After the inspector leaves, Andy reprimands the kitchen staff for their lack of thoroughness, though backtracks when he learns that the turbot that he had prepared earlier was discarded by the inspector for not being labelled.
Front of house Beth holds a short meeting to discuss the evening's service being overbooked.
She also mentions that they have a marriage proposal on one table and a booking for celebrity chef Alastair Skye, for whom Andy previously worked, plus his guest for the evening, a known food critic.

During dinner service, conflict begins to brew in the kitchen and dining room.
Beth annoys the kitchen staff with micro-management;
a black waitress is treated with hostility by an aggressive guest (in contrast to her white colleague); a young pastry chef is revealed to be self-harming; a pregnant kitchen porter spars with a lazy and disrespectful co-worker; and the new cold chef Camille, who is from France, struggles with the language barrier and British regional accents.

Tension grows until Beth demands the already-stressed chef Carly to go off-menu by preparing steak and chips to appease a group of "influencer" guests; Carly finally blows up at her, telling her that she is failing the restaurant with her lack of ability. Beth retreats to the toilets in tears, admitting to her father on the phone that she does not think the job is right for her. Andy serves Alastair's table, where Alistair reveals that Andy owes him £200,000 and wants the payment in full to cover his private losses. Andy explains that he does not have the money to pay him back.
Alistair offers to work together again and to split Andy's 30% ownership of the restaurant with him.

A guest suffers a severe allergic reaction, which Camille had inadvertently caused.
Taking advantage of the situation, Alastair informs Andy that Carly should take the fall or else the restaurant as well as their potential partnership will fail. After the guest is picked up by an ambulance, the kitchen staff and Beth meet at the back of kitchen to determine the cause. They conclude that it was Andy's fault the food was contaminated;
earlier, he had instructed Camille to use a bottle containing walnut oil as a substitute garnish.
This culminates in one of the chefs, Freeman, lambasting Andy for his constant lateness and mistakes as well as his rampant alcoholism. A fight nearly breaks out between Andy and Freeman, which Carly prevents.

The staff return to work and Andy then reveals to Carly that Alastair wanted him to lay the blame on her, which leads to Carly quitting. Andy goes to his office, where he drinks vodka and snorts cocaine.
He calls his ex-wife, and asks her to tell his son he loves him, and that he will go to rehab. After ending the call, Andy throws away the drugs and alcohol and starts to return to the kitchen before collapsing. The staff's voices are heard calling his name.

Cast
 Stephen Graham as Andy Jones
 Vinette Robinson as Carly
 Alice Feetham as Beth
 Hannah Walters as Emily
 Malachi Kirby as Tony
 Izuka Hoyle as Camille
 Taz Skylar as Billy
 Lauryn Ajufo as Andrea
 Jason Flemyng as Alastair Skye
 Ray Panthaki as Freeman
 Lourdes Faberes as Sara Southworth
 Áine Rose Daly as Robyn
 Daniel Larkai as Jake

Reception

Box office
In the United Kingdom, the film earned $107,525 from fifty-three theaters in its opening weekend. The film went on to gross $1,142,493 worldwide.

Critical response
The film received critical acclaim.  At the 2021 British Independent Film Awards, Boiling Point was nominated for eleven awards and won four — including Best Supporting Actress for Vinette Robinson, Best Casting, Best Cinematography, and Best Sound.

Glenn Kenny of The New York Times noted in regards to the film's one-shot nature that, "when [the camera] trails a restaurant worker taking out the trash, the viewer knows they're not being removed from the central action just to observe labor — there's a plot point to be ticked."

References

External links
 
 

2021 films
British drama films
One-shot films
2020s English-language films
2020s British films
Films about chefs
Films set in restaurants